Syed Sajjad Ali Shah (17 February 1933 – 7 March 2017) was a Pakistani judge who served as the 13th Chief Justice of Pakistan from 4 June 1994 to 2 December 1997. He had been appointed as Chief Justice of the Supreme Court by Benazir Bhutto. Prior to that, he served as the 6th Chief Justice of Sindh High Court from 13 December 1989 to 4 November 1990.

Early life and career 
Shah was born on 17 February 1933 in Karachi. He enrolled as an advocate in 1959, and eventually became a district public prosecutor, an additional district and sessions judge, and, later, a district and sessions judge.

He was appointed as joint secretary in the federal Ministry of Law and Parliamentary Affairs and, in 1977, was posted as the Registrar of the Supreme Court. In 1987, he was made a judge of the Sindh High Court 1987.

Shah served as the Chief Justice of Sindh High Court from 13 December 1989 to 4 November 1990.

Chief Justice of Pakistan 
When Dr. Nasim Hasan Shah retired as Chief Justice of Pakistan in 1994, Justice Saad Saud Jan should have taken his place based on seniority. But Prime Minister Benazir Bhutto threw tradition overboard when she bypassed two senior judges and appointed Sajjad Ali Shah as Chief Justice of Pakistan. Later, she was dismissed by President Farooq Leghari on charges of corruption, and Sajjad Ali Shah, along with six other judges of the Supreme Court, upheld this decision. Reading from a 12-page short order, Chief Justice Sajjad Ali Shah said: "The presidential order contained enough substance and adequate material had been provided to conclude that the government could not be run in accordance with the provisions of the constitution and that an appeal to the electorate had become necessary." He became a critic of Nawaz Sharif and matters came to a head in 1997 when Sharif was defending himself in Supreme Court against accusations of corruption. An unruly mob stormed into the Supreme Court, forcing CJ Sajjad Ali Shah to adjourn the case against PM Nawaz Sharif. Hundreds of Sharif supporters broke through the police cordon around the courthouse and the Chief Justice had to flee for his safety. The police managed to restore order only after baton charging and tear gassing the mob, both inside and outside the courthouse. 

President Leghari had given his support to Sharif. He was appalled by the measures being taken by the government but had no powers to dismiss it since the Eighth Amendment had been revoked. He was particularly concerned when he was asked by the government to dismiss Syed Sajjad Ali Shah and appoint an acting Chief Justice of Pakistan. He, therefore, resigned on 2 December 1997. Shortly afterwards, Muhammad Rafiq Tarar was elected to replace him as the President. On 23 December, Ajmal Mian was appointed as permanent Chief Justice. Sajjad Ali Shah had been dismissed.

Death
Syed Sajjad Ali Shah died at the age of 84 on 7 March 2017 in Karachi after suffering from severe chest infection.

Other services
 Former Chairman of Iran-Pakistan Friendship Association

Works
 Law Courts in a Glass House: An Autobiography,

See also
Chief Justice of Pakistan
Supreme Court of Pakistan
List of Pakistanis

References

Further reading 
 Judging the State : Courts and Constitutional Politics in Pakistan, by Paula R. Newburg 

|-

1933 births
2017 deaths
Chief justices of Pakistan
Sindhi people
Lawyers from Karachi
Sindh Muslim Law College alumni
Chief Justices of the Sindh High Court